(The) Garden of Love may refer to:

Literature and art
"The Garden of Love" (poem), a poem by William Blake 
The Garden of Love (Rubens), a painting by Rubens

Film and TV
Garden of Love (film), a 2003 German horror film
Las Vegas Garden of Love, a 2005 reality television series

Music

Albums
Garden of Love (album), a 1980 album by Rick James
Garden of Love, an album by Raymond Donnez
Garden of Love, a 1997 album by Roxanne Beck
The Garden of Love, a 1997 album by Kevin Ayers
The Garden of Love, a 1999 album by Frankie Armstrong

Songs
"Garden of Love" (song), a 2014 song by Kim-Lian
"Garden of Love", a song by Thelma Aoyama with Makai
"Ai no Sono (Touch My Heart!)" (English:"Garden of Love: Touch My Heart!"), a song by Morning Musume Otomegumi
"Garden of Love", a 1961 song by The Safaris
"Garden of Love", a 1963 song by Gene Pitney
"My Garden of Love", a pun-laden parody of torch songs by Benny Hill